Country Versatile is the debut album released by rap group, Dirty. It was independently released on July 13, 1999 through Nfinity Music.

Track listing
"Dirty Niggaz"- 3:51  
"Vogues/Cadillac Anthem"- 3:50  
"Young Niggaz"- 4:20  
"All I Do"- 5:23  
"Dirt I Bleed"- 5:09  
"Ride"- 6:09  
"What They Really Want"- 4:36  
"Pimp and Gangsta"- 6:33  
"Dirty Gul"- 5:09  
"Deep"- 4:52  
"South West"- 5:37  
"Twerk Sum"- :49  
"Really, Real"- 4:01  
"Dirty Luv"- 4:58

1999 debut albums
Dirty (group) albums